Fortune Hunter may refer to:

The Fortune Hunter, a play by W. S. Gilbert, first produced in 1897
The Fortune Hunter, a play by Winchell Smith which inspired several film adaptations:
The Fortune Hunter (1914 film)
The Fortune Hunter (1920 film)
The Fortune Hunter (1927 film)
 A Fortune Hunter, a 1921 Swedish silent film
Fortune Hunter (TV series), a 1994 drama series
"Fortune Hunter" (song), written by Jimmy Page and Chris Squire
Fortune Hunter, a pricing game on the gameshow The Price Is Right
Fortune Hunter, a video game published by Romox in 1982 for Atari 400/800 home computers

See also
Treasure Hunters (disambiguation)